When the Lights Go Down may refer to:

 When the Lights Go Down (book), a collection of movie reviews by the critic Pauline Kael
 "When the Lights Go Down" (Armand Van Helden song)
 "When the Lights Go Down" (Faith Hill song)
 "When the Lights Go Down", a song by Edie Brickell on the album Picture Perfect Morning
 "When the Lights Go Down", a song by Chad Brownlee on the album The Fighters